Jordan Carl Wheeler Davis (born March 30, 1988) is an American country pop singer and songwriter. He is signed to Universal Music Group Nashville's MCA Nashville division, for which he has released one album and two extended plays.

Biography and career 
Jordan Carl Wheeler Davis was born in Shreveport, Louisiana, to mother Luwanna and father Ricky. He has a brother, Jacob Davis (who is also a country singer), and a sister, Jentry. His uncle, Stan Paul Davis, wrote Tracy Lawrence's hit singles "Today's Lonely Fool" and "Better Man, Better Off". He attended C. E. Byrd High School before graduating college with an Environmental Science degree from Louisiana State University.

After graduation, he moved to Nashville in 2012, and secured a recording contract with Universal Music Group Nashville in 2016.

Davis's debut single, "Singles You Up", came out in mid-2017. He wrote the song with Steven Dale Jones and Justin Ebach. It hit number one on the Billboard Country Airplay chart in April 2018. The corresponding debut album, Home State, was released on March 23, 2018. Paul DiGiovanni, guitarist for Boys Like Girls, produced the album. "Take It from Me" was released to country radio on May 7, 2018; it was the second single from the album. It reached number two on the Country Airplay chart in March 2019. The album's third single, "Slow Dance in a Parking Lot" released to country radio on April 22, 2019, and also topped Country Airplay.

In May 2020, Davis announced the release of his self-titled extended play, which was produced by Paul DiGiovanni. Davis said "I can't tell y'all how pumped I am for y'all to hear these songs. I'm proud of this one." The EP was preceded by the release of "Cool Anymore", "Detours", and "Almost Maybes". Davis is nominated for ACM Song of the Year and Single of the Year with "Buy Dirt" featuring Luke Bryan. They won Song of the Year. Davis co-wrote the single "Broken Umbrella" by Jojo Mason.

In November 2022, Davis performed at the halftime show at the 109th Grey Cup in Regina, Saskatchewan alongside Tyler Hubbard and Josh Ross.

Personal life
Davis married Kristen O'Connor in 2017. Their daughter was born on November 17, 2019. Their son was born on September 4, 2021.

Discography

Studio albums

Extended plays

Singles

Official singles

Promotional singles

Other charted songs

Music videos

Awards and nominations

References

American country singer-songwriters
American male singer-songwriters
Country musicians from Louisiana
Living people
Louisiana State University alumni
MCA Records artists
People from Shreveport, Louisiana
Musicians from Shreveport, Louisiana
1988 births
21st-century American singers
21st-century American male singers
Singer-songwriters from Louisiana